The commune of Gitaramuka is a commune of Karuzi Province in central Burundi. The capital lies at Gitaramuka.

References

Communes of Burundi
Karuzi Province